Neomelanesthes atopa is a moth in the family Cosmopterigidae. It is found on Rennell Island.

References

Natural History Museum Lepidoptera generic names catalog

Cosmopterigidae